Live at Red Rocks Amphitheatre is the second live album by Australian singer-songwriter Vance Joy. The album was released on 16 November 2018 on the last date of the World Tour. The first live album was from the Fire and the Flood Tour, available only for download via his mailing list, and social media subscribers.

Critical reception

Genevieve Morris from The AU Review said "The whole album creates a sweet reminiscent atmosphere", adding "the set is well constructed and Vance Joy's amiable and delightful nature takes you through a lyrical look at love, lust and the messiness of relationships.".

Track listing

Release history

References

2018 live albums
Vance Joy live albums
Albums recorded at Red Rocks Amphitheatre